James Hart may refer to:

Entertainment
 James McDougal Hart (1828–1901), Scottish-American painter
 James Hart (artist) (fl. 1940s and 1950s), British illustrator
 James V. Hart (born 1960), American screenwriter
 James Hart (vocalist) (born 1979), American singer for the metal band Eighteen Visions

Politics
 James Hart (Ontario politician) (1820–1898), Canadian politician
 James Hart (Australian politician) (1825–1873), New South Wales politician
 James L. Hart (fl. 2000s), American political candidate in Tennessee
 James P. Hart (1904–1987), Justice of the Supreme Court of Texas

Sports
 James "Hub" Hart (1878–1960), American baseball player and football coach
 James Hart (rugby union) (born 1991), Irish rugby union player

Other
 James Hart (physician) (fl. 1633), English physician and medical writer
 James Morgan Hart (1839–1916), American English professor and philologist
 James D. Hart (1911–1990), American English professor at University of California, Berkeley
 James Hart (police officer) (fl. c. 2000), British commissioner
 James Hart, protagonist of the 1970 novel The Paper Chase, its 1973 film adaptation and the subsequent TV series
 James Hart (minister) (1663–1729), minister of Greyfriars Kirk in Edinburgh

See also
 James Hart Wyld (1913–1953), American engineer
 Jamie Hart (disambiguation)
 Jim Hart (disambiguation)